A Child Arrangement Order or Child Arrangements Order (CAO)  is an agreement under English family law concerning where a child lives and whom a child can have contact with. CAOs are usually sought following the breakdown of a relationship and replace 'contact orders' and 'residence orders'. Their legal basis is under section 8 of the Children Act 1989.

See also
Prohibited Steps Order
Parental Responsibility Order

References

Family law in the United Kingdom